Illusion is the first Korean EP released by K-POP group ZE:A. The album was released on August 9, 2013.

Background
On August 5, 2013 Star Empire Entertainment released an audio teaser for Illusion's title track The Ghost Of Wind. Later, on August 9, a video teaser of the music video was released. The song Step By Step was released as a pre-release single.

The comeback with the EP Illusion marked the return of ZE:A's leader, Moon Junyoung, after being away from promotional activities due to a leg injury.

Promotion

Illusion promotions began on August 8, 2013 with a showcase and mini-fanmeet. The following day televised music show promotions started with a performance on KBS' Music Bank.

The title track off Illusion, The Ghost Of Wind, peaked at number 21 on the Gaon Charts and is the highest position any ZE:A has reached since their debut single, Mazeltov. The album itself peaked at number six on the Gaon charts, selling roughly 41,221 albums before it fell from the top 100.

A Japanese single version of Illusion was released on November 28, 2013. Both a Japanese and Korean music video of Step By Step were released on November 1, 2013 to promote its release.

Track listing

Japanese single track listing

References

External links
Music Daum Page 
Music Daum Page (Japanese Single)

ZE:A albums
2013 EPs